Alexandre Blokh, called Jean Blot, (31 March 1923, Moscow – 23 December 2019, Sainte-Geneviève-des-Bois (Essonne)) was a French writer, translator, and senior civil servant of Russian origin.

Biography 
Blot came from two bourgeois families (St. Petersburg diamonds for his father, wholesale grocer for his mother). In the USSR of the twenties, his parents worked at the defense commissioner for his father, as a lawyer for street children for his mother. His family moved to Germany at the time of the NEP, then moved to Paris where he attended primary school. Sent to England to learn English for high school, he spent the war in France. A Russian and Jewish refugee, he fled to Lyon and engaged in the Resistance (Le juif Margolin 1998). He was a doctor of Law, Bachelor of Arts, International Civil Servant at the United Nations in New York (1946–1956), in Geneva (1958–1961) then at the UNESCO in Paris (from 1962). He travelled all over the world. International Secretary of the PEN club from 1981 to 1997 and then International Vice President of Pen Club since 1998 and President of the French Pen club from 1999 to 2005. In 1990 he created the Russian Pen club. He was a novelist but also a literary critic in relation to his trilingualism (French, Russian, English).

Works 
1951: Naissance de l'État coréen
1956: Le Soleil de Cavouri, Éditions Gallimard
1959: Les Enfants de New-York, Gallimard
1961: Obscur ennemi, Gallimard
1964: Les Illusions nocturnes
1968: La Jeune Géante, Gallimard
1971: La Difficulté d’aimer, Gallimard
1972: Ossip Mandelstam, Seghers, series Poètes d'aujourd'hui
1973: Là où tu iras, La Table Ronde
1976: Les Cosmopolites, Gallimard
1979: Sporade (récits de voyage), Arthaud, series "Terre écrite"
1980: Marguerite Yourcenar, Seghers
1981: Gris du ciel, Gallimard
1984: Ivan Gontcharov ou le réalisme impossible, 1984
1984: La Montagne sainte, Albin Michel
1985: Tout l’été, Albin Michel
1988: Sainte Imposture, Albin Michel
1990:Si loin de Dieu et Autres Voyages, Albin Michel
1992: Bloomsbury, Histoire d’une sensibilité artistique et politique anglaise, Balland
1995: Albert Cohen ou Solal dans le siècle, Albin Michel
1995: Nabokov, Seuil, collection Écrivains de toujours
1998: Le Juif Margolin, Plon
2001: Moïse, notre contemporain, Albin Michel
2002: Roses d'Amérique, Balland
2005: Le soleil se couche à l’est, Éditions du Rocher
2008: Une vie à deux, le Rocher
2010: Le Roman, poésie de la prose, Champion
2012: Affaire de Cœur, Pierre-Guillaume de Roux
2015: Tout sera paysage, Gallimard

Literary prizes 
1977: Prix Valery-Larbaud for Les Cosmopolites.
1982: Prix Cazes brasserie Lipp for Gris du ciel.
1984: Prix Valentine de Wolmar for La Montagne sainte.
1985: Grand prix de la Critique littéraire for Ivan Gontcharov ou le réalisme impossible.
1986: Prix d'Académie for his lifetime achievement.

Media 
France Culture devoted five programs to him in 2012.

Bibliography 
Comprendre, issue 28, 1964,

References

External links 
 http://www.imec-archives.com/fonds/blot-jean/, fiche sur le site de l'IMEC
 Pascal Ory, Jean Blot, in : Dictionnaire des étrangers qui ont fait la France, Robert Laffont/Bouquins/Segher, 2013
 Jean Blot on Babelio
 Jean Blot on Poenix
 Jena Blot on the site of Éditions Gallimard

1923 births
2019 deaths
20th-century French writers
20th-century French male writers
21st-century French writers
French expatriates in the United Kingdom
Translators from Russian
Prix Valery Larbaud winners
French male non-fiction writers
20th-century French translators
Soviet expatriates in Germany
Soviet emigrants to France
PEN International